Lost Kingdoms of Africa is a British television documentary series. It is produced by the BBC. It describes the pre-colonial history of Africa. The series is narrated by Dr. Gus Casely-Hayford.

The series was originally commissioned as part of the Wonderful Africa Season on BBC Four in the lead up to the 2010 World Cup.

The first season of Lost Kingdoms of Africa was originally screened in the UK on BBC Four each Tuesday night over four weeks, starting on 5 January 2010.
The second season of Lost Kingdoms of Africa was broadcast over four weeks, starting on 30 January 2012.

Episode list: Season One

Episode 1: Nubia
First aired on 5 January 2010
 Art historian Gus Casely-Hayford explores the history of the old African kingdom of Nubia.

Episode 2: Ethiopia
First aired on 12 January 2010
 The Kingdom of Ethiopia.

Episode 3: Great Zimbabwe
First aired on 19 January 2010
 Great Zimbabwe, a symbol of African genius.

Episode 4: West Africa
First aired on 26 January 2010
 An investigation of 16th-century bronzes from the Kingdom of Benin.

Episode list: Season Two

Episode 1: The Kingdom of Asante
First aired on 30 January 2012
 Asante, a kingdom that was built on gold and slaves.

Episode 2: The Zulu Kingdom
First aired on 6 February 2012
 The secrets behind the Zulus' cultural power and military strength.

Episode 3: The Berber Kingdom of Morocco
First aired on 13 February 2012
 Morocco, once the centre of a vast kingdom created by Berbers.

Episode 4: Bunyoro & Buganda
First aired on 20 February 2012
 How the Ugandan kingdom of Bunyoro saw its dominance challenged by the rise of Buganda.

See also
List of kingdoms in pre-colonial Africa

References

External links
 
 

BBC high definition shows
Documentary films about historical events
2010s British documentary television series
2010 British television series debuts
2012 British television series endings
BBC television documentaries
BBC television documentaries about history
English-language television shows
Television series by Banijay